Latibulus is a genus of wasps in the family Ichneumonidae. There are two species in Europe:

Biology
Latibulus argiolus is a parasitoid which lies in wait in the near proximity of a Polistes paper wasp nest waiting for an opportunity for penetration and then, within a few seconds, lays an egg into a nest cell. The biology of the larva is unknown. There are two generations per year. The first emerges in the summer after pupation takes place in a yellowish cocoon within the cell; the second generation winters in a brown, resistant cocoon. The pupa of the second generation is able to break through the cell cover by making jerky movements. The pupa falls to the ground, looks for a recess by making rolling movements, and winters there.

References

 S. Makino, 1983: Biology of Latibulus argiolus (Hymenoptera, Ichneumonidae), a parasitoid of the paper wasp Polistes biglumis (Hymenoptera, Vespidae) [biology] Kontyu 51:426-434, 1983

External links 

 www.hornissenschutz.de: Fotos der Puppenstadien
 National Agricultural University of Ukraine: Literaturelink (Russian / English)
 Hymis Forum

Cryptinae
Ichneumonidae genera
Taxa named by Johannes von Nepomuk Franz Xaver Gistel